George Thomas Van Bebber (October 21, 1931 – May 26, 2005) was a United States district judge of the United States District Court for the District of Kansas.

Education and career

Born in Troy, Kansas, Van Bebber received a Bachelor of Arts degree from the University of Kansas in 1953 and a Bachelor of Laws from the University of Kansas School of Law in 1955. He then entered private practice in Troy until 1959, when he became an Assistant United States Attorney for the District of Kansas until 1961, thereafter returning to private practice until 1982. During that time, he was County attorney for Doniphan County, Kansas from 1963 to 1969. Van Bebber served in the Kansas House of Representatives from 1973 to 1975 and was a Republican.

Federal judicial service

In 1989, Van Bebber became a United States magistrate judge of the United States District Court for the District of Kansas. On September 13, 1989, he was nominated by President George H. W. Bush to a seat on that court vacated by Richard Dean Rogers. He was confirmed by the United States Senate on November 21, 1989, and received his commission on December 8, 1989. He served as chief judge from 1995 to 2000, and assumed senior status on December 31, 2000. He was succeeded by Julie A. Robinson. He continued to serve in senior status until his death, in Prairie Village, Kansas.

References

Sources
FJC Bio

1931 births
2005 deaths
Assistant United States Attorneys
Judges of the United States District Court for the District of Kansas
Republican Party members of the Kansas House of Representatives
People from Troy, Kansas
United States district court judges appointed by George H. W. Bush
20th-century American judges
United States magistrate judges
University of Kansas alumni
University of Kansas School of Law alumni
People from Prairie Village, Kansas
20th-century American politicians